A Million Thoughts and They're All About You is the fourth studio album by Swedish electronic band Alice in Videoland, released in Sweden on 11 February 2011 by Artoffact Records. It includes the singles "Spaceship" and "Something New" as well as the hit anthem "Little Bird."

Track listing
All songs written by Anders Alexander and Toril Lindqvist, except where noted.

"Take Me with You" – 3:10
"Little Bird" – 3:48
"Spaceship" (Alexander, Lindqvist, Lariemar Krokvik, Fredrik Lindblom, Tommy Thorell) – 3:15
"Something New" – 3:29
"In a Band" – 3:03
"No Matter" – 3:36
"Bender" (Krokvik, Lindblom, Thorell) – 3:55
"Last Lover" (Alexander, Lindqvist, Anton Sahlberg) – 3:21
"Buffalo Stance" (Neneh Cherry, Cameron McVey, Phil Ramacon, Jamie Morgan) – 3:10
"Spaceship" (The At Least Somewhat Censored Version) – 3:14 †
"Little Bird" (100 Volt Remix) – 3:27 †

† Only available on the CD version.

Personnel
Anders Alexander – drums, mixing, producer, synthesizer
Jon Axelsson – mixing
Nanna Björnsson – backing vocals
Sunniva Løvland Byvard – photography
Johan Dahlbom – bass guitar, design, keyboards, layout
Anja Dahlgren – cover photo, photography
Martin Kenzo – guitar, keyboards
Lariemar Krokvik – drums, mixing, producer, synthesizer
Fredrik Lindblom – drums, mixing, producer, synthesizer
Toril Lindqvist – vocals
Tove Mattisson – backing vocals
Anton Sahlberg – bass guitar, guitar
Rachel Seow – backing vocals
Ludwig Sersam – backing vocals
Tommy Thorell – drums, mixing, producer, synthesizer

Release history

References

2010 albums
Alice in Videoland albums